André Crépin (8 December 1907 – 16 December 1994) was a French athlete. He competed in the men's pole vault at the 1936 Summer Olympics.

References

1907 births
1994 deaths
Athletes (track and field) at the 1936 Summer Olympics
French male pole vaulters
Olympic athletes of France
Place of birth missing